Jindřich Severa (5 April 1909 – 9 November 1980) was a Czech sculptor. His work was part of the sculpture event in the art competition at the 1948 Summer Olympics.

References

1909 births
1980 deaths
20th-century Czech sculptors
20th-century male artists
Czech male sculptors
Olympic competitors in art competitions
People from Jičín District